The arrondissement of La Flèche is an arrondissement of France in the Sarthe department in the Pays de la Loire region. It has 118 communes.

Composition

The communes of the arrondissement of La Flèche, and their INSEE codes, are:

 Amné (72004)
 Arthezé (72009)
 Asnières-sur-Vègre (72010)
 Aubigné-Racan (72013)
 Auvers-le-Hamon (72016)
 Auvers-sous-Montfaucon (72017)
 Avessé (72019)
 Avoise (72021)
 Le Bailleul (72022)
 Bazouges Cré sur Loir (72025)
 Beaumont-sur-Dême (72027)
 Beaumont-Pied-de-Bœuf (72028)
 Bousse (72044)
 Brains-sur-Gée (72045)
 La Bruère-sur-Loir (72049)
 Brûlon (72050)
 Cérans-Foulletourte (72051)
 Chahaignes (72052)
 Chantenay-Villedieu (72059)
 La Chapelle-aux-Choux (72060)
 La Chapelle-d'Aligné (72061)
 La Chartre-sur-le-Loir (72068)
 Chassillé (72070)
 Château-l'Hermitage (72072)
 Chemiré-en-Charnie (72074)
 Chemiré-le-Gaudin (72075)
 Chenu (72077)
 Chevillé (72083)
 Clermont-Créans (72084)
 Coulans-sur-Gée (72096)
 Coulongé (72098)
 Courcelles-la-Forêt (72100)
 Courdemanche (72103)
 Courtillers (72106)
 Crannes-en-Champagne (72107)
 Crosmières (72110)
 Dissay-sous-Courcillon (72115)
 Dureil (72123)
 Épineu-le-Chevreuil (72126)
 Étival-lès-le-Mans (72127)
 Fercé-sur-Sarthe (72131)
 Fillé (72133)
 La Flèche (72154)
 Flée (72134)
 La Fontaine-Saint-Martin (72135)
 Fontenay-sur-Vègre (72136)
 Le Grand-Lucé (72143)
 Guécélard (72146)
 Joué-en-Charnie (72149)
 Juigné-sur-Sarthe (72151)
 Jupilles (72153)
 Lavernat (72160)
 Lhomme (72161)
 Ligron (72163)
 Loir en Vallée (72262)
 Longnes (72166)
 Louailles (72167)
 Loué (72168)
 Louplande (72169)
 Luceau (72173)
 Luché-Pringé (72175)
 Le Lude (72176)
 Maigné (72177)
 Malicorne-sur-Sarthe (72179)
 Mansigné (72182)
 Marçon (72183)
 Mareil-en-Champagne (72184)
 Mareil-sur-Loir (72185)
 Mayet (72191)
 Mézeray (72195)
 Montreuil-le-Henri (72210)
 Montval-sur-Loir (72071)
 Nogent-sur-Loir (72221)
 Noyen-sur-Sarthe (72223)
 Oizé (72226)
 Parcé-sur-Sarthe (72228)
 Parigné-le-Pôlin (72230)
 Notre-Dame-du-Pé (72232)
 Pincé (72236)
 Pirmil (72237)
 Poillé-sur-Vègre (72239)
 Pontvallain (72243)
 Précigné (72244)
 Pruillé-l'Éguillé (72248)
 Requeil (72252)
 Roëzé-sur-Sarthe (72253)
 Sablé-sur-Sarthe (72264)
 Saint-Christophe-en-Champagne (72274)
 Saint-Denis-d'Orques (72278)
 Saint-Georges-de-la-Couée (72279)
 Saint-Germain-d'Arcé (72283)
 Saint-Jean-de-la-Motte (72291)
 Saint-Jean-du-Bois (72293)
 Saint-Ouen-en-Champagne (72307)
 Saint-Pierre-de-Chevillé (72311)
 Saint-Pierre-des-Bois (72312)
 Saint-Pierre-du-Lorouër (72314)
 Saint-Vincent-du-Lorouër (72325)
 Sarcé (72327)
 Savigné-sous-le-Lude (72330)
 Solesmes (72336)
 Souligné-Flacé (72339)
 Souvigné-sur-Sarthe (72343)
 Spay (72344)
 La Suze-sur-Sarthe (72346)
 Tassé (72347)
 Tassillé (72348)
 Thoiré-sur-Dinan (72356)
 Thorée-les-Pins (72357)
 Vaas (72364)
 Vallon-sur-Gée (72367)
 Verneil-le-Chétif (72369)
 Villaines-sous-Lucé (72376)
 Villaines-sous-Malicorne (72377)
 Vion (72378)
 Viré-en-Champagne (72379)
 Voivres-lès-le-Mans (72381)
 Yvré-le-Pôlin (72385)

History

The arrondissement of La Flèche was created in 1800. In February 2006 it absorbed the five cantons of La Chartre-sur-le-Loir, Château-du-Loir, Le Grand-Lucé, Loué and La Suze-sur-Sarthe from the arrondissement of Le Mans.

As a result of the reorganisation of the cantons of France which came into effect in 2015, the borders of the cantons are no longer related to the borders of the arrondissements. The cantons of the arrondissement of La Flèche were, as of January 2015:

 Brûlon
 La Chartre-sur-le-Loir
 Château-du-Loir
 La Flèche
 Le Grand-Lucé
 Loué
 Le Lude
 Malicorne-sur-Sarthe
 Mayet
 Pontvallain
 Sablé-sur-Sarthe
 La Suze-sur-Sarthe

Sub-prefects 
 Gérard Bougrier : 1982-1985 : sub-prefect of La Flèche

References

La Fleche